George Stott is the name of:

George Stott (architect) (1876–1936), English architect
George Stott (footballer) (born 1906), English footballer
George Stott (missionary) (1835–1889), British missionary
George Stott (wrestler) (1888–1969), British wrestler
George Stott, Lord Stott (1909–1999), Scottish lawyer